Rebecca Chambers is a fictional character in the Resident Evil media franchise.

Rebecca Chambers and Becky Chambers may also refer to:

People 
 Becky Chambers (born 1985), American author of science fiction novels
 Rebecca Chambers (pianist) (born 1975), Australian concert pianist and the 1996 winner the Young Australian of the Year Award
 Rebecca Ballard Chambers (1858–1920), newspaper editor-in-chief and temperance leader
 Rebecca Chambers (born 1970), Canadian pole vaulter who competed in the 1999 Pan American Games